Byron Phelps (March 4, 1842 – March 3, 1934) was an American politician who served as the Mayor of Seattle from 1894 to 1896.

References

1842 births
1934 deaths
Mayors of Seattle
Washington (state) Republicans